Beni is the debut album of artist Beni Arashiro, released on February 9, 2005. The album is available in two different versions, CD+DVD and CD-only. The CD+DVD version was a limited edition, and has sold out. There were a total of four singles released before the release of this album.
The album charted on the #14 spot on the Oricon ranking and sold 12,776 copies in its first week.

Track listing

Singles

Album sales

Total Reported Sales: 18,181

References

2005 debut albums
Beni (singer) albums